Algorithms + Data Structures = Programs is a 1976 book written by Niklaus Wirth covering some of the fundamental topics of computer programming, particularly that algorithms and data structures are inherently related. For example, if one has a sorted list one will use a search algorithm optimal for sorted lists.

The book was one of the most influential computer science books of the time and, like Wirth's other work, was extensively used in education.

The Turbo Pascal compiler written by Anders Hejlsberg was largely inspired by the Tiny Pascal compiler in Niklaus Wirth's book.

Chapter outline
Chapter 1 - Fundamental Data Structures
Chapter 2 - Sorting
Chapter 3 - Recursive Algorithms
Chapter 4 - Dynamic Information Structures
Chapter 5 - Language Structures and Compilers
Appendix A - the ASCII character set
Appendix B - Pascal syntax diagrams

References

External links
ETH Zurich / N. Wirth / Books / Compilerbau: Algorithms + Data Structures = Programs (archive.org link)
N. Wirth, Algorithms and Data Structures (1985 edition, updated for Oberon in August 2004. Pdf at ETH Zurich) (archive.org link)
 
 

Computer programming books
History of computing
Computer science books
1976 non-fiction books
Prentice Hall books